Nocturne painting is a term coined by James Abbott McNeill Whistler to describe a painting style that depicts scenes evocative of the night or subjects as they appear in a veil of light, in twilight, or in the absence of direct light. In a broader usage, the term has come to refer to any  painting of a night scene, or night-piece, such as Rembrandt's The Night Watch.

Whistler used the term within the title of his works to represent paintings with a "dreamy, pensive mood" by applying a musical name. He also titled (and retitled) works using other terms associated with music, such as a "symphony", "harmony", "study" or "arrangement", to emphasize the tonal qualities and the composition and to de-emphasize the narrative content. The use of the term "nocturne" can be associated with the Tonalism movement of the American of the late 19th century and early 20th century which is "characterized by soft, diffused light, muted tones and hazy outlined objects, all of which imbue the works with a strong sense of mood." Along with winter scenes, nocturnes were a common Tonalist theme.<ref>Conrads, Margaret C. (1990). American Paintings and Sculpture at the Sterling and Francine Clark Art Institute. Contributor: Sterling and Francine Clark Art Institute. Hudson Hills. p. 148. .</ref> Frederic Remington used the term as well for his nocturne scenes of the American Old West.

Rembrandt’s nocturnes
In northern Europe, the Dutch Golden Age produced one of the greatest artists of all time. The first artist to paint scenes on a regular basis in the nocturne mode was Rembrandt van Rijn (1606–1669). Many of his portraits were also painted using a nocturne method. As in The Mill (1645), most of his landscapes were painted to evoke a sense of the nocturne, which could be expressed in either a calm or stormy manner.

Night scenes by Rembrandt

Nocturnes by James Abbott McNeill Whistler

“Nocturne” was a term that was normally applied to certain types of musical compositions before James Abbott McNeill Whistler (1834–1903), inspired by the language of music, began using the word within the titles of many of his works, such as Nocturne in Blue and Silver (1871), in the collection of the Tate Gallery, London, United Kingdom.

Frederic Remington’s nocturnes
Frederic Remington (1861-1909) is so identified for his nocturne scenes of the American Old West that they were celebrated in 2003-2004 with an exhibition, Frederic Remington: The Color of Night, co-organized and shown in turn by the National Gallery of Art, Washington, D.C., and the Gilcrease Museum, Tulsa, Oklahoma. The exhibition also generated a colorful book of the same title and travelled to the Denver Art Museum in Denver, Colorado. Remington painted many of his nocturnes in the last years of his life, when he was transitioning from a career as an illustrator to that of a fine artist and had chosen Impressionism as the style in which he worked at the time. One example of his work is The Stampede (also known as The Stampede by Lightning, 1908).

Nocturnes by Frederic Remington
The paintings pictured in the gallery below are in order of date completed, left to right:

Night scenes by American Impressionists and other American Realists

Thomas Cole (1801–1848), Moonlight (1833–34)
George Inness (1825-1894), Pool in the Woods, 1892, Worcester Art Museum, Worcester, Massachusetts
John Henry Twachtman (1853-1902), Canal Venice c. 1878, private collection
John Henry Twachtman (1853–1902), L'Etang c. 1884, private collection
Albert Pinkham Ryder (1847–1917), Death on a Pale Horse (The Race Track) c. 1910, The Cleveland Museum of Art, Ohio
Frank Tenney Johnson (1874-1939), Rough Riding Rancheros c. 1933
Edward Hopper (1882-1967), Nighthawks, 1942, Art Institute of Chicago, Chicago, Illinois

Night scenes by American Impressionists and American Realists

Night scenes by artists of other movements

.
Other artists who also created nocturne scenes are:

Jacob van Ruisdael (1628–1682), Landscape with Church (circa 1660)]
Jacob van Ruisdael, Landscape (circa 1665)
Augustus Leopold Egg (1816–1863), Past and Present Number Three (circa 1853)]
John LaFarge (1835-1920), The Lady of Shalott (1862)
Edgar Degas (1834–1917), Interior (nicknamed The Rape) (1868–69), Philadelphia Museum of Art
Vincent van Gogh (1853-1890), Starry Night Over the Rhone (1888)

See also
 Artists who have used the term for a series of their works James Abbott McNeill Whistler
 Frederic Remington
 Rembrandt van Rijn
 Night in paintings (Eastern art)
 Tonalism
 Night photography

References

Further reading
Holden, Donald. Whistler: Landscapes and Seascapes. Lakewood, New Jersey: Watson-Guptill Publications, 1984.
Anderson, Nancy with Alexander Nemerov and William Sharpe. Frederic Remington: The Color of Night. Washington, D.C.: National Gallery of Art, 2003.
Sharpe, William C. New York Nocturne: The City After Dark In Literature, Painting, and Photography, 1850-1950. Princeton, New Jersey: Princeton University Press, 2008.
Simpson, Marc and others. Like Breath on Glass: Whistler, Inness, and the Art of Painting Softly''. Williamstown, Massachusetts: Sterling and Francine Clark Art Institute, 2008 (printed by Yale University Press).

Painting
Painting techniques
Artistic techniques
Visual arts genres
Moon in art